Waña Q'awa (Aymara waña dry, q'awa little river, ditch, crevice, fissure, gap in the earth, "dry brook" or "dry ravine", also spelled Guañacahua) is a mountain in the Andes of Peru which reaches a height of approximately . It is located in the Tacna Region, Tacna Province, Palca District. Waña Q'awa lies northeast of the archaeological site of Wila Wilani.

References 

Mountains of Tacna Region
Mountains of Peru